Feketeerdő is a village in Győr-Moson-Sopron county, Hungary. It lies near Mosonmagyaróvár and is close to both the Austrian and Slovakian borders.

External links 
 Street map 

Populated places in Győr-Moson-Sopron County